El Castillo (Spanish for "The Castle") may refer to:

Municipalities and towns
El Castillo (municipality), Río San Juan department, Nicaragua
El Castillo (village)
El Castillo, Meta, Colombia
El Castillo, Texas, U.S. 
El Castillo, Masaya, a comarca in San Juan de Oriente, Nicaragua
Caleta de Fuste, also known as El Castillo, in Antigua, Fuerteventura, Canary Islands

Archaeological sites
El Castillo, Chichen Itza, a Mesoamerican step-pyramid (Structure 5B18) in Mexico
Pyramid El Castillo, at Tulum, Quintana Roo, Mexico
El Castillo, part of the Cotzumalhuapa archaeological zone in Guatemala
El Castillo, a fortification near Valdecañas de Cerrato, Baltanás, Spain
El Castillo, remains of an ancient Arab fortress, in Cuenca, Spain

Other uses
El Castillo (Mexibús), a BRT station in Nezahualcóyotl, Mexico
El Castillo, Chancay, Peru, a faux castle
El Castillo, at the Chautla Hacienda, Puebla, Mexico
El Castillo, a route up the Chimborazo volcano, Ecuador
El Castillo Hotel, a historic building in Valle Hermoso, Argentina
Antiguo Cuartel Militar Español de Ponce, also known as El Castillo, listed on the NRHP in Ponce, Puerto Rico 
Upuigma-tepui, also known as El Castillo, a table mountain in Bolívar state, Venezuela

See also

The Castle (disambiguation)
El Castillon, an archaeological site in Zamora, Spain
IWRG El Castillo del Terror, an annual professional wrestling event 
Cave of El Castillo, part of Caves del Monte Castillo, in Puente Viesgo, Cantabria, Spain